Live (also known as Live in Nottingham) is the first video album by the British heavy metal band Saxon. It was released in VHS and Laserdisc (PAL and NTSC in Japan) in 1983 by PolyGram Videos. The video has not been released on DVD so far. Even so, it is available in full on YouTube and bootleg format / pro-shot. The video still brings some video clips recorded for the release of Power and Glory disc, as the title track, Suzy Hold On and Nightmare.

Track listing
 "Intro - Suzie Hold On"
 "Never Surrender"
 "Princess of the Night"
 "The Eagle Has Landed"
 "Redline"
 "This Town Rocks"
 "Power and the Glory"
 "And the Bands Played On"
 "747 (Strangers in the Night)"
 "Wheels of Steel"

Personnel
Biff Byford - vocals
Graham Oliver - guitar
Paul Quinn - guitar
Steve Dawson - bass guitar
Nigel Glockler - drums

References

Saxon (band) video albums
1983 video albums
Live video albums
PolyGram video albums